9/10: The Final Hours is a 2014 American-Canadian documentary film featuring interviews with various people describing their personal experiences on the day of September 10, 2001 ("9/10"), prior to the September 11 attacks that destroyed the Twin Towers of the World Trade Center. Directed by Erik Nelson and produced by Amy Briamonte, the documentary was released in 2014 on Amazon Prime (US) and YouTube. Having no valid IMDb page, the documentary received positive critical reviews in spite of little to no promotion, and was aired on National Geographic's various television channels. The musical soundtrack score was composed by Mark Leggett and uploaded separately to his own music website.

Plot
9/10: The Final Hours interviews a cocktail bartender who worked in the Windows On the World restaurant within the top of the World Trade Center, an anchorman for New York City, a Canadian photographer and tourist who took pictures and has one of the last admittance tickets to the World Trade Center's observation deck, Cantor Fitzgerald CEO Howard Lutnick, and many others who were there the day before the September 11th Attacks. The documentary also presents images from the 9/11 Memorial Museum and the "Tribute in Light", a memorial made from the remaining foundations of the Twin Towers that casts a foggy turquoise light into the sky in a vertical column resembling the space where both towers once stood.

Reception
9/10: The Final Hours received positive reviews from critics. Alex Ashlock of WBUR called the documentary "compelling, if at times difficult to watch, because even though it's about the day before the attacks on September 11, 2001, what happened that morning shadows everything the people in the film say." The Arab Times noted the surprising revelations in the documentary, saying, "some seemingly everyday decisions saved lives, while others ultimately cost them."

The documentary was uploaded to YouTube by cinematographer Thomas Kaufman, as well as sold on Amazon in the US, and also aired on National Geographic's TV channels.

References

2014 documentary films
Documentary films about the September 11 attacks
Films about terrorism in the United States
Documentary films about death
Documentary films about New York City
Documentary films about disasters